Jantay Karabek uulu better known as Jantay Batyr (1794, Beysheke village, Chüy Valley - 1867, Beysheke village, Chüy Valley, Russian Empire) was a Kyrgyz statesman and public figure of the first half of the 19th century. Comes from the Tynay clan of the  tribe. Participated in kurultai and at the coronation of the all-Kyrgyz Khan in 1842.

Biography

References 

1794 births
1867 deaths
History of Kyrgyzstan
Heads of state in Asia